Yucatania is a  genus of sea sponge. It is monotypic, with the single species Yucatania sphaeroidocladus.

References

Tetractinellida
Animals described in 1999
Monotypic sponge genera